The Seven Islands of Bombay (Portuguese: Ilhas de Bom Baim) were 16th-century Portuguese colonial possessions lying off the Konkan region by the mid-west coast of India.

History
They were partly handed over to England under this title as part of the dowry of Catherine Braganza when she married Charles II in 1661. The isles and islets had earlier been part of indigenous polities like the Silhara dynasty and the Gujarat Sultanate before they were captured by the Portuguese Armadas in 1534. After acquiring them as through a royal dowry from the Kingdom of Portugal, Charles II leased Bombay and adjacent islets to the East India Company in 1668 for £10 per year. 

By 1845, the islands had been merged into one landmass by means of multiple land reclamation projects. The resulting island of Bombay was later merged with the nearby islands of Trombay and Salsette that lay to its north-east and north respectively to form Greater Bombay. These islands now constitute the southern part of the city of Bombay (Mumbai).

The original seven islands handed over to England were as follows:

 Colaba
 Isle of Bombay
 Mahim
 Mazagaon
 Old Woman's Island (Little Colaba)
 Parel
 Worli

There also are several smaller islands that lay to the east of the main seven islands:

 Butcher Island
 Cross Island
 East Ground
 Elephanta Island, also Known as Gharapuri
 Middle Ground
 Oyster Rock

See also 
 Geography of Mumbai
 History of Bombay under British rule
 History of Bombay under Portuguese rule (1534–1661)

References

External links 
 The Seven Islands: Mumbai
 Story of cities #11: the reclamation of Mumbai – from the sea, and its people?

7 (number)
States and territories established in 1534
States and territories disestablished in 1661
 
Former islands of India
1534 establishments in the Portuguese Empire
1661 establishments in the British Empire
Catherine of Braganza